The 2004 Golden Corral 500 was the 4th race of the 2004 NASCAR Nextel Cup Series season, held at Atlanta Motor Speedway on March 14, 2004. The race was won by Dale Earnhardt Jr., who led 55 laps that day.

Ryan Newman of Penske Racing would win the pole, while Tony Stewart of Joe Gibbs Racing would lead the most laps with 127 laps led. 125,000 were in attendance for the race.

Entry list

Qualifying 
Ryan Newman would win the pole with a 28.640. Kirk Shelmerdine would qualify for his first ever NASCAR Cup Series race.

Results

References

External links 
2004 Golden Corral 500 qualifying

Golden Corral 500
NASCAR races at Atlanta Motor Speedway
Golden Corral 500
Golden Corral 500